The system of state parks in Colorado integrates outdoor recreation with tourism. There are currently forty-two parks open to the public, and there is one in development. Colorado State Parks host over eleven million visitors each year. Colorado State Parks celebrated its fiftieth anniversary in 2009.

Colorado Parks and Wildlife takes the lead in managing Colorado's boating, off-highway vehicle, snowmobile, river-outfitter licensing, and trails programs.


Colorado State Parks

See also

State of Colorado
Colorado Department of Natural Resources
Colorado Parks and Wildlife
List of Colorado natural areas
List of Colorado state parks
List of Colorado state wildlife areas
List of protected areas of Colorado

References

External links

Colorado state government website
Colorado Department of Natural Resources website
Colorado Parks and Wildlife website
Colorado State Recreation Lands
Map of Colorado State Parks

 
Colorado geography-related lists
Protected areas of Colorado
Tourism in Colorado
Tourist attractions in Colorado
Colorado state parks, List of
Parks in Colorado